Jenna is a female given name. In the English-speaking world it is a variation of Jenny, which is itself a diminutive of Jane, Janet, Jennifer and is often used as a name in its own right.

Notable people 
 Jenna Boyd (born 1993), film actress
 Jenna Bush (born 1981), daughter of President George W. Bush
 Jenna-Anne Buys (born 1985), South African figure skater
 Jenna Coleman (born 1986), English actress
 Jenna Dewan (born 1980), film actress
 Jenna Elfman (born 1971), film actress
 Jenna Fife (born 1995), Scottish footballer
 Jenna Fischer (born 1974), American film and TV actress
 Jenna Haze (born 1982), porn actress
 Jenna Jameson (born 1974), former pornographic actress
 Jenna Johnson (born 1967), competitive swimmer
 Jenna Johnson (born 1994), professional dancer
 Jenna Lee (born 1980), anchor on Fox Business News
 Jenna Leigh Green (born 1974), actress
 Jenna Lester (born 1989), American dermatologist
 Jenna McCorkell (born 1986), figure skater
 Jenna McDougall (born 1992), Australian singer 
 Jenna Morasca (born 1981), winner of Survivor: The Amazon and wrestler
 Jenna Marbles (born 1986), American entertainer
 Jenna Ortega (born 2002), American actress and model
 Jenna Presley (born 1987), American minister and former pornographic actress
 Jenna Rose (born 1998), American singer
 Jenna Russell (born 1967), English actress
 Jenna Santoromito (born 1987), water polo player
 Jenna Ushkowitz (born 1986), Korean-American adoptee, actress, singer, dancer, producer and podcast host
 Jenna von Oÿ (born 1977), actress and country singer
 Jenna Welch (1919-2019), mother of Laura Bush and grandmother of Jenna Bush

Fictional characters 
 Jenna in the animated Balto film series
 Jenna in the video game series Golden Sun
 Jenna, the leading character of the Magyk novel series by Angie Sage
 Jenna Ashby, one of three main female characters, in 2011 novel Wither
 Jenna Avid in Baywatch Hawaii
 Jenna Hamilton, central character in Awkward, a teen television series
 Jenna Maroney in television series 30 Rock
 Jenna Marshall, character from Pretty Little Liars
 Jenna Middleton in television series Degrassi: The Next Generation
 Jenna Morgan in the TV series Arthur
 Jenna Rink in the movie 13 going on 30 played by Jennifer Garner
 Jenna Sommers in television series The Vampire Diaries
 Jenna Stannis in the British science fiction television series Blake's 7
 Jenna Wade in Dallas (1978 TV series)
 Jenna Whitehall, a character in the 2012 movie We'll Meet Again

Music 
 Jenna, 1989 album by Gerald Wilson

See also 
 
 Janna (disambiguation)
 Jena (framework), open source software project 
 Jena (given name)

References 

English feminine given names